The Conspiracy is a 1916 American silent drama film featuring Harry Carey.

Cast
 Harry Carey
 Edith Johnson
 Lee Shumway (as Leon C. Shumway)
 Edwin Wallock (as E.N. Wallack)

Reception
Like many American films of the time, The Conspiracy was subject to cuts by city and state film censorship boards. The Chicago Board of Censors required cuts of the intertitle "Pour that in her glass, do you understand?" flash scenes involving gambling and the scene showing a suicide.

See also
 List of American films of 1916
 Harry Carey filmography

References

External links

1916 films
American silent short films
American black-and-white films
1916 drama films
1916 short films
Films directed by Henry MacRae
Silent American drama films
1910s American films